Diogo Santos Rangel (born 19 August 1991) is a Brazilian footballer who plays as a defender for Série D club Toledo. Although he played for the Timor-Leste national team, he was later found ineligible by the Asian Football Confederation.

Club careers

Dili United
After he defended the Timor Leste U-23 in the arena Southeast Asian Games he joined a local club in Dili, Timor Leste, namely Dili United.

Sriwijaya Football Club
After undergoing selection for two weeks with Sriwijaya, Diogo got a contract offer from the club's management. On 8 November 2012 Diogo agreed to sign a three-year contract with Sriwijaya. He scored his first goal for Sriwijaya against Persisam Putra Samarinda, but his goal could not help his team from losing 2–4.

Gresik United
In May 2013 Diogo loaned to Gresik United from the Sriwijaya for 5-month until the end of season.

Daejeon Citizen
In March 2014 Diogo join Daejeon Citizen.

Lee Man
On 19 July 2019, Diogo signed for Hong Kong Premier League club Lee Man. On 21 January 2020, his contract was terminated.

International career
Despite having no links with East Timor, Diogo had been naturalised and played for the country at three different levels between 2011 and 2016.

He began his international career as a Timor Leste U-23 that in preparing for the Southeast Asian Games in November 2011. Diogo made his debut as a national team U-23 as warm-up match against Indonesia U-23 on 25 October 2011, which ended in defeat 0–5. After that he played in 5 games and scored 1 goal in the event the Southeast Asian Games. In February 2012 he summons national team U-21 to compete in the arena 2012 Hassanal Bolkiah Trophy, in the event he scored 1 goal in 4 games. In July 2012 was recalled to the national team U-23 that competed in the 2013 AFC U-22 Asian Cup qualification. In this tournament he played 5 times and scored one goal.

On 5 October 2012 he made his debut as a Timor Leste national football team in the match against Cambodia in the event the 2012 AFF Suzuki Cup qualification which ended with a 5–1 win. Until now Diogo has played in four games for the national team.

On 19 January 2017, the Asian Football Confederation declared Diogo and eleven other Brazilian footballers ineligible to represent East Timor. Two months later, the East Timorese passport he had received has been declared ‘null and void’ by the Ministry of Justice of East Timor.

Honours

Club honors
Sriwijaya
Indonesian Inter Island Cup (1): 2012

Daejeon Citizen
K League Challenge (2): 2014

AA São Caetano
Campeão Paulista A2 (3): 2017

AA Anapolina
Acesso ao Campeonato Brasileiro (4): 2018

 Melhor Defensor dos ultimos tempos, INDONESIA LEAGUE

References

External links
 
 
 Diogo Rangel at affsuzukicup.com
 Play Video at Youtube

1991 births
Living people
Footballers from São Paulo
Brazilian footballers
Association football defenders
Liga 1 (Indonesia) players
Sriwijaya F.C. players
Daejeon Hana Citizen FC players
Gangwon FC players
Diogo Rangel
Diogo Rangel
CR Vasco da Gama players
Sociedade Esportiva Palmeiras players
Clube Atlético Bragantino players
Botafogo Futebol Clube (PB) players
Associação Desportiva São Caetano players
Associação Atlética Anapolina players
CSF Bălți players
Sampaio Corrêa Futebol Clube players
Lee Man FC players
Campeonato Brasileiro Série C players
Moldovan Super Liga players
K League 2 players
Diogo Rangel
Diogo Rangel
Hong Kong Premier League players
Brazilian expatriate footballers
Brazilian expatriate sportspeople in Indonesia
Expatriate footballers in Indonesia
Brazilian expatriate sportspeople in South Korea
Expatriate footballers in South Korea
Brazilian expatriate sportspeople in Thailand
Expatriate footballers in Thailand
Expatriate footballers in Hong Kong
Brazilian expatriates in Hong Kong

Timor-Leste international footballers
Asian Games competitors for East Timor
Footballers at the 2014 Asian Games